The Oceania Beach Handball Championship is the official competition for Under 17 years national beach handball teams of Oceania region. It was first organized by the Oceania Continent Handball Federation in 2017. The first champions for boys were Australia and for girls America Samoa. In addition to crowning the Oceania champions, the tournament also serves as a qualifying tournament for the World Championships and also the Youth Olympic Games.  The first competition was held in Raratonga in the Cook Islands from 3 May 2017 until 5 May 2017.

Champions

Boy's division

Participating nations

Girl's division

Participating nations

References

See also
 Oceania Continent Handball Federation
 Oceania Beach Handball Championship
 Oceania Junior Beach Handball Championship - Under 19's

Beach handball competitions
Oceania Handball Championship
Recurring sporting events established in 2017